The Venezuela national rugby union team is classified as a third tier rugby playing nation. They joined the IRB in 1998. They entered the Rugby World Cup qualification matches for the 2003 and 2007 Rugby World Cup's, but were twice eliminated by Brazil.

Coaches 
  Rex Lawrence
  Carlos de Pascual
  José Queirel
  Graciano Molina
  Gustavo López (since July 2012)

Rugby World Cup qualification 
 1987 - Did not enter
 1991 - Did not enter
 1995 - Did not enter
 1999 - Did not enter
 2003 - Did not qualify
 2007 - Did not qualify
 2011 - Did not qualify
 2015 - Did not qualify
 2019 - Did not qualify

Overall

See also 
 Rugby union in Venezuela
 Venezuela national rugby sevens team
 Venezuela women's national rugby sevens team

References

Sources 
  feverugby.com - Official Site

South American national rugby union teams
Rugby union in Venezuela
R